Pulau Aie Station (PLA), also spelled by its old name Puluaer Station or in Malay as Pulau Air Station, is a class-I railway station located in Pasa Gadang, Padang Selatan, Padang, West Sumatra, Indonesia. It is the first railway station built in the city, situated quite close to the historic old town of Padang. Located at the altitude of +2 m, it is operated by the Regional Division II West Sumatra of Kereta Api Indonesia as a part of railway line reactivation throughout West Sumatra. It has two railway tracks with original line continues southwest to the old port of Muaro, but the line is not reactivated. Since 2007, the government of Padang City officially designated the station as a cultural property.

The station was opened in 1891, closed in the 1980s, and reopened in 2021.

Services 
 Minangkabau Express, to

Gallery

References 

Buildings and structures in Padang
Railway stations in West Sumatra